The 1983 Holy Cross Crusaders football team was an American football team that represented the College of the Holy Cross as an independent during the 1983 NCAA Division I-AA football season. The Crusaders ranked No. 3 nationally but lost in the quarterfinals of the Division I-AA playoff. 

In their third year under head coach Rick E. Carter, the Crusaders compiled a 9–2–1 record (9–1–1 regular season). Harry Flaherty, Matt Martin and Rob Porter were the team captains.

An eight-game winning streak to open the campaign saw Holy Cross steadily climb in the weekly national rankings, reaching No. 1 in time for their last regular-season game. After suffering their first loss of the year in that season-ender -- to Division I-A Boston College, in a game played at the New England Patriots home stadium -- the Crusaders dropped to No. 3 in the Division I-AA rankings, and earned a playoff first-round bye before being eliminated in the second round. 

Holy Cross played its home games, including its first-ever home playoff game, at Fitton Field on the college campus in Worcester, Massachusetts.

Schedule

References

Holy Cross
Holy Cross Crusaders football seasons
Holy Cross Crusaders football